Jakarta Matador Football Club was an Indonesian football club based in South Jakarta. They compete in the Liga 3.

History
The club was founded on 21 April 2005 as the Markuban Football Association. On 17 October 2005, the club was accepted as a member of the Football Association of Indonesia.

In the 2013 season, the club played in the first division after acquiring PS Markuban, a football team from Jambi, and the club temporarily changed its name to become Markuban Matador FC.

Club officials
Source:Bagan Pengurus Klub
Owner: Heru Pujihartono

Matador Limited
Chairman: Heru Pujihartono
Executive vice chairman: Rully Suwandi
Chief operating officer: Wisnu Wibowo
Director of corporate development: Ichwan Hasbi, SE

Matador Football Club
Directors: Heru Pujihartono
Chief operating officer: Wisnu Wibowo
Treasurer: Ichwan Hasbi, SE
Media officer: Muhammad Rusjdi

Coaching and medical staff
Head coach: Lapril A.S 
Assistant Manager: E Lexius Malau
Nutritionists: Jaka Zulkarnaen

References

External links
Official website

Football clubs in Indonesia
Defunct football clubs in Indonesia
Football clubs in Jakarta
Association football clubs established in 2005
2005 establishments in Indonesia